The Marauders is a 1955 American Western film directed by Gerald Mayer and starring Dan Duryea, Jeff Richards, Keenan Wynn and Jarma Lewis.

Plot
Avery, who wears a Confederate Army uniform even though he didn't serve in the Civil War, demands that the men who work for rancher John Rutherford avenge him after Rutherford is killed trying to remove a squatter, Corey Everett, from his land.

A passing family, the Ferbers, are traveling by wagon. They meet Corey, who explains that he is homesteading, not squatting, and entitled to the property. Corey defended himself alone with dynamite after Rutherford's men attacked, but Avery became convinced that Corey had many men fighting by his side. He insists his men, led by ranch foreman Hook, call him "General" and obey his orders to launch another attack.
 
Hannah Ferber doesn't trust Corey at all. Her husband Louis is taken captive by Avery, who tortures and kills him, refusing to believe the truth that Corey is alone. Avery's men realize he is insane and intend to leave, so Avery destroys their water supply. Corey's water is now the only one within hundreds of miles.

Hannah shoots Corey in the shoulder and flees with her son, but returns to nurse him back to health after Louis's body is found. Together they stave off Avery, whose men desert him. Avery dies, astounded to learn that Corey had no other men fighting with him.

Cast
 Dan Duryea as Avery
 Jeff Richards as Corey Everett
 Keenan Wynn as Hook
 Jarma Lewis as Hannah Ferber
 John Hudson as Roy Rutherford 
 Harry Shannon as John Rutherford
 David Kasday as Aibie Ferber
 James Anderson as Louis Ferber
 Richard Lupino as Perc Kettering
 Peter Mamakos as Ramos
 Mort Mills as Carmack
 John Damler as Cooper
 Michael Dugan as Sal
 Ken Carlton as Thumbo

Reception
According to MGM records the movie earned $551,000 in the US and Canada and $37,000 elsewhere, making a loss to the studio of $110,000.

See also
List of American films of 1955

References

External links

The Marauders at TCMDB

1955 films
1955 Western (genre) films
American Western (genre) films
Films based on American novels
Films based on Western (genre) novels
Metro-Goldwyn-Mayer films
1955 drama films
Films scored by Paul Sawtell
1950s English-language films
1950s American films